The Clement Oak was a large old white oak tree in Deptford Township, New Jersey. It is believed to have sprouted between 1555 and 1615, and was destroyed by a storm in the early 21st century.

The Clement Oak was located behind the Deptford Wal-Mart, near Big Timber Creek, on land that once belonged to the Clement family. The original plans for construction of the Wal-Mart called for the tree to be felled, but Wal-Mart was persuaded to alter their plan so the tree could be spared. 

The Clement Oak is said to have been known to the aboriginal Lenape, and to have been noticed by the first European settlers, as it served as a reference point in early land surveys. According to unsubstantiated local lore, native pow wows were held there, and a treaty between settlers and the Lenape was signed beneath its branches. The Gloucester County Historical Society honored the Clement Oak during New Jersey's 300 year anniversary celebration in 1964.

The Clement Oak was the site of the landing of the first aerial flight in the New World, a 1793 balloon flight. On January 9, 1793, Jean-Pierre Blanchard took off from Philadelphia and landed in Deptford at the Clement Oak. During his flight, Blanchard may have carried a personal letter from George Washington to be delivered to the owner of whatever property Blanchard happened to land on, which if true would have made the flight the first delivery of air mail in the United States as well; the letter is also said to have included a directive that all U.S. citizens were requested to assist him to return to Philadelphia (Blanchard did not speak English), which if true would make it the first known use of a blood chit for an airman.

A plaque was placed at the tree to commemorate the balloon flight. A second plaque was placed to commemorate the tree itself, reading "The Clement Oak, which sheltered Lenape hunters 4 centuries ago and children at play in later years, is dedicated during the tercentenary of New Jersey as symbolic of the state's continuing growth – Gloucester County Historical Society July 1964".

As of June 4, 2020 most of the tree had been torn away, leaving only a dead stump a few meters tall.

References

Deptford Township, New Jersey
Individual trees in New Jersey
Individual oak trees